Fenusella nana  is a Palearctic species of  sawfly.

References

External links
 The sawflies (Symphyta) of Britain and Ireland

Tenthredinidae
Hymenoptera of Europe
Insects described in 1816
Taxa named by Johann Christoph Friedrich Klug